Events in the year 1960 in Belgium.

Incumbents
Monarch: Baudouin
Prime Minister: Gaston Eyskens

Events
 30 June – Belgian Congo becomes independent Republic of the Congo.
 1 November – Treaty establishing Benelux Economic Union comes into force, providing for the free movement of persons, goods, capital and services between Belgium, the Netherlands, and Luxembourg.
 15 December – King Baudouin marries Doña Fabiola de Mora y Aragón in Brussels.

Art and architecture
Paintings
 René Magritte, Les mémoires d'un saint

Births
 15 April – Prince Philippe
 12 July – Walter De Donder, actor and politician

Deaths
 8 March – Marie Janson, politician (born 1873)

References

 
1960s in Belgium
Belgium
Years of the 20th century in Belgium
Belgium